This is an incomplete list of lakes of British Columbia, a province of Canada.

Larger lake statistics

*

List of lakes

1
101 Mile Lake
103 Mile Lake
105 Mile Lake
108 Mile Lake

A
Adams Lake
Alouette Lake
Alta Lake (British Columbia)
Ambrose Lake (British Columbia)
Anderson Lake (British Columbia)
Angora Lake
Angus Horne Lake
Arrow Lakes
Atlin Lake
Azure Lake
Azouzetta Lake

B
Babine Lake
Ball Lake
Battleship Lake
Bear Lake (Bear River)
Bennett Lake
Berg Lake
Bolton Lake (British Columbia)
Bridge Lake (British Columbia)
Brigade Lake
Bughouse Lake
Buntzen Lake

C
Cahilty Lake (British Columbia)
Canim Lake (British Columbia)
Capilano Lake
Carp Lake Provincial Park
Carpenter Lake
Cecil Lake (Peace River Country)
Chadsey Lake
Champion Lakes Provincial Park
Charlie Lake (British Columbia)
Charlotte Lake (British Columbia)
Cheakamus Lake
Chehalis Lake
Cheslatta Lake
Chilcotin Lake
Chilko Lake
Chilliwack Lake
Christina Lake (British Columbia)
Chute Lake
Clearwater Lake (British Columbia)
Clendinning Lake
Clowhom Lake
Columbia Lake
Como Lake (British Columbia)
Consinka Lake
Coquitlam Lake
Costalot Lake
Cowichan Lake
Croteau Lake
Cuisson Lake
Cultus Lake, British Columbia
Cunningham Lake

D
Davis Lake (British Columbia)
Dease Lake (British Columbia)
Decker Lake (British Columbia)
Deer Lake (British Columbia)
Deka Lake
Devick Lake (British Columbia)
Divers Lake
Duncan (Amazay) Lake
Duncan Lake (British Columbia)

E
Eagle Lake (British Columbia)
Elfin Lakes
Elk Lake (British Columbia)
Elk Lakes (British Columbia)
Elsay Lake
Emerald Lake (British Columbia)
Emma Lake, (Powell River Area)
Lake Errock (British Columbia)
Evans Lake (British Columbia)

F
Floe Lake
François Lake
Frog Lakes

G
Garibaldi Lake
Gates Lake
Granite Lake (Kawdy Plateau)
Granite Lake (Powell River)
Green Lake (Cariboo)
Green Lake (Whistler)
Greendrop Lake
Greig Lake (Vancouver Island)
Gun Lake (British Columbia)
Gunanoot Lake

H
Harrison Lake
Hatzic Lake
Hawthorn Lake
Hayward Lake
Hobson Lake
Horsefly Lake
Howard Lake (British Columbia)

I
Ilthpaya Lake
Inga Lake
Inland Lake Provincial Park

J
Jack Shark Lake
John Hart Lake
Junker Lake

K
Kalamalka Lake
Kamloops Lake
Kawkawa Lake
Kennedy Lake (Vancouver Island)
Kinbasket Lake
Kinney Lake
Kitkiata Lake
Kluskus Lakes
Knewstubb Lake
Knouff Lake (British Columbia)
Kokanee Lake
Lake Koocanusa
Kootenay Lake
Kostal Lake
Kotcho Lake

L
Lac La Hache
Lafarge Lake
Lajoie Lake
Lava Lake
Lava Lakes
Lac Le Jeune
Lightning Lake
Lillooet Lake
Lindeman Lake (Chilkoot Trail)
Lindeman Lake (Chilliwack)
Little Lillooet Lake
Little Shuswap Lake
Lizard Lake (Juan de Fuca, Vancouver Island)
Lizard Lake (Vancouver Island)
Lizard Pond
Long Lake (British Columbia)
Long Lake (Smith Inlet)
Long Lake (Vancouver Island)
Loon Lake, British Columbia
Lost Lagoon
Lost Lake (Whistler)

M
Mabel Lake
Macallan Lake
Mahoney Lake
Mahood Lake
Maltby Lake
Mara Lake
Marblerock Lake
Mariwood Lake
Marsh Marigold Lake
Martin Lake (British Columbia)
Mary Lake (British Columbia)
Lake McArthur
McCombe Lake
McCoy Lake
McDougall Lake
McLeese Lake
Mercs Lake
Mess Lake
Meziadin Lake Provincial Park
Mill Lake (British Columbia)
Moberly Lake (British Columbia)
Monte Lake
Moose Lake (British Columbia)
Morfee Lake
Moyie Lake
Muncho Lake
Murtle Lake

N
Nanaimo Lakes
Nation Lakes
Nechako Lakes
Ness Lake
Nicola Lake
Nimpkish Lake
Nimpo Lake
Nitinat Lake

O
Lake O'Hara
Lake Oesa
Okanagan Lake
Opabin Lake
Osoyoos Lake
Otter Lake, British Columbia
Owikeno Lake

P
Paterson Lake
Paul Lake Provincial Park
Pavilion Lake
Peak Lake
Pinantan Lake
Piper Lake
Pitt Lake
Poum Lake
Powell Lake
Puntzi Lake

Q
Quesnel Lake
Quennell Lake

R
Ray Lake
Lake Revelstoke
Rimrock Lake, British Columbia
Robson Lake
Rose Lake (British Columbia)
Rose Lake (Bulkley)
Ross Lake (Washington)
Rice Lake (North Vancouver, BC)

S
Sasamat Lake
Scum Lake (British Columbia)
Seton Lake
Shawnigan Lake
Sherbrooke Lake (British Columbia)
Shuswap Lake
Sikanni Chief Lake
Silver Snag Lake
Silvermere Lake (Canada)
Skaha Lake
Slocan Lake
Somers Lake
Spider Lake (Vancouver Island)
Spotted Lake
Squeah Lake
Squint Lake
Stave Lake
Stawamus Lake
Stuart Lake
Stump Lake
Sulphurous Lake
Sumas Lake
Summit Lake (Crooked River)
Sustut Lake
Swan Lake (Okanagan)

T
Tagish Lake
Takla Lake
Taseko Lakes
Tatla Lake
Tatlatui Lake
Tatlayoko Lake
Teslin Lake
Thetis Lake
Thutade Lake
Toy Lake (Vancouver Island)
Trembleur Lake
Trout Lake (British Columbia)
Tuc-el-nuit Lake
Tumtum Lake
Tuya Lake
Tyaughton Lake

U
Upper Summit Lake (British Columbia)

V
Vaseux Lake
Vidette Lake
View Lake (Vancouver Island)
Volcano Lake

W
Wagner Lakes
Wahleach Lake
Wanetta Lake
Wapta Lake
Wasa Lake
Wedgemount Lake
Wheaton Lake
Whonnock Lake
Wicheeda Lake
Williams Lake (British Columbia)
Williamson Lake
Williston Lake
Windermere Lake (British Columbia)
Wokkpash Lake
Wood Lake (British Columbia)

X
Xenov Lake

See also
List of lakes of Canada

References

 
British Columbia
Lakes